David R. Kessler is a Democratic politician and former member of the Pennsylvania House of Representatives for the 130th legislative district. He was elected in 2006. In 2010, he lost his second bid for re-election.
 
Kessler was a member of the Oley Township, Pennsylvania Board of Supervisors from 1993 to 2010. Prior to elective office, he was the owner of Tri-State Funding Inc., an equipment financing company.

References

External links

Living people
Democratic Party members of the Pennsylvania House of Representatives
1957 births
York College of Pennsylvania alumni
People from Phoenixville, Pennsylvania